Women's Signal Corps  may refer to:

Merlinettes, a World War II unit of the French army known formally as Women's Signal Corps.
Hello Girls, a World War I unit of the  U.S. Army Signal Corps known formally as Signal Corps Female Telephone Operators Unit.